The Rally Mexico competition in 2014 was won by the French drivers Sébastien Ogier and Julien Ingrassia for the Volkswagen Motorsport team.

Entry list

Results

Event standings

Championship standings after the race

WRC

Drivers' Championship standings

Manufacturers' Championship standings

Other

WRC2 Drivers' Championship standings

WRC3 Drivers' Championship standings

References

Results – juwra.com/World Rally Archive
Results – ewrc-results.com

External links 
 The official website of the World Rally Championship

Mexico
Rally Mexico
Rally Mexico